Nicola Pasetto (20 June 1961, in Verona – 29 March 1997) was an Italian politician. He represented the Italian Social Movement (from 1992 to 1995) and the National Alliance (from 1995 to 1997) in the Chamber of Deputies.

References

1961 births
1997 deaths
Politicians from Verona
Politicians of Veneto
Italian Social Movement politicians
National Alliance (Italy) politicians
Deputies of Legislature XI of Italy
Deputies of Legislature XII of Italy
Deputies of Legislature XIII of Italy